Kingdom Seekers is the fourth studio album by Christian singer-songwriter Twila Paris. Released in 1985, it is her first album on the Star Song label. The album peaked at number 13 on the Billboard Top Inspirational Albums chart. The first single "Runner" would top the Christian AC chart for 9 weeks and was written by Paris and her sister Starla. The next two singles "Lamb of God" and "He Is Exalted" would become Paris' praise and worship standards. "He Is Exalted" is ranked at number 66 from CCM Magazines 2006 book CCM Presents: The 100 Greatest Songs in Christian Music and Kingdom Seekers is ranked at number 57 on The 100 Greatest Albums in Christian Music.

 Track listing 
All songs written by Twila Paris, except where noted.
"Runner" (T. Paris, Starla Paris) - 4:01
"Center of Your Will" - 4:40
"Tellin' the Truth" - 4:18
"Language of Disciples" - 3:37
"Lamb of God" - 4:05
"The Child Inside You" - 4:05
"Breaking My Heart" - 3:21
"It All Goes Back" - 3:52
"Release of the Spirit" (instrumental) - 2:10
"He Is Exalted" - 3:44
"Faithful Men" - 3:24

 Personnel 
 Twila Paris – lead vocals, backing vocals 
 Carl Marsh – keyboards, Fairlight programming, arrangements 
 Rhett Lawrence – synthesizers, Fairlight programming 
 Marty Walsh – electric guitars
 Leon Gaer – bass guitar 
 Keith Edwards – drums 
 Alex MacDougall – percussion
 Jonathan David Brown – backing vocals 
 Starla Paris – backing vocals Production'
 Jonathan David Brown – producer, recording, mixing 
 Bill Cobb – additional engineer 
 Bret Teegarden – additional engineer 
 Bernie Grundman – mastering at A&M Studios (Hollywood, California)
 Dave Rogers – art direction, design

Charts

Radio singles

References 

1985 albums
Twila Paris albums